Cyprus participated in the Junior Eurovision Song Contest 2007 which took place in Rotterdam, the Netherlands. Yiorgos Ioannides represented the country with the song "I mousiki dinei ftera".

Before Junior Eurovision

National final
The final was held on 29 September 2007. The winner was chosen by a 50/50 combination of votes from a professional jury and public televoting.

At Junior Eurovision

Voting

Notes

References 

Cyprus
2007
Junior Eurovision Song Contest